Henequen is a 1996 South Korean film directed by Kim Ho-sun. It was awarded Best Film at the Grand Bell Awards ceremony.

Plot
This historical drama, set in 1905, depicts the difficult plight of Korean henequen field laborers in Mexico. The story follows the love between the daughter of an aristocratic family fallen on hard times, and the son of a butcher.

Background
The film tells the story of Korean people who were brought to Yucatán under false promises of a good life, including wealthy Koreans, but were instead ended up forced to work as slaves by the Yucatán henequen industry landlords, which were proud Spanish descendants of the Yucatecan upper class. At that time, it was the main industry of the Yucatán state and henequen was referred to as the "green gold", as it made many Yucatecan families very wealthy.

This part of history where Korean people were used as slaves under brutal conditions (and even killed), didn't appear in Yucatecan history books until recently. When the movie was filmed outside of Mérida, Yucatán, it became a real eye opener to Yucatecan society about the horrible abuse inflicted to Korean people decades ago, which they were not aware of.

The henequen plant, which produces the sisal fibre, is traditionally used for rope and twine, and is a fibrous plant from the Yucatán State, in the Yucatán Peninsula of Mexico.

Cast
Chang Mi-hee
Yim Sung-min
Kim Seong-su
Kim Cheong
No Yeong-guk
Lee Jong-man
Han Tae-il
Joo Ho-sung
Park Kwang-jin
Hong Jeong-uk

Bibliography

References

External links

1996 films
Best Picture Grand Bell Award winners
1990s Korean-language films
Films set in 1905
Films set in Mexico
South Korean historical films